There are over 9000 Grade I listed buildings in England. This page is a list of the 215 Grade I listed buildings in the county of Hampshire. There are also five Grade I listed parks and gardens which are not listed here.

Basingstoke and Deane

|}

City of Portsmouth

|}

City of Southampton

|}

East Hampshire

|}

Fareham

|}

Gosport

|}

Hart

|}

Havant

|}

New Forest

|}

Rushmoor

|}

Test Valley

|}

Winchester

|}

See also
 :Category:Grade I listed buildings in Hampshire
 Grade II* listed buildings in Hampshire

Notes

References

National Heritage List for England

External links

 
Hampshire
Lists of listed buildings in Hampshire